Heilprinia coltrorum is a species of sea snail, a marine gastropod mollusk in the family Fasciolariidae, the spindle snails, the tulip snails and their allies.

Description

Distribution
This marine species occurs in the Florida Strait.

References

 Hadorn R. & Rogers B. (2000). Revision of recent Fusinus (Gastropoda: Fasciolariidae) from tropical Western Atlantic, with description of six new species. Argonauta. 14: 5-57.
 Vermeij G.J. & Snyder M.A. (2018). Proposed genus-level classification of large species of Fusininae (Gastropoda, Fasciolariidae). Basteria. 82(4-6): 57-82.

coltrorum
Gastropods described in 2000